Rozstání is a municipality and village in Prostějov District in the Olomouc Region of the Czech Republic. It has about 600 inhabitants.

Administrative parts
The village of Baldovec is an administrative part of Rozstání.

References

Villages in Prostějov District